Techier is a community in the Republic of Trinidad and Tobago. It is located in south-western Trinidad and is administered by the Point Fortin Borough Corporation.

Populated places in Trinidad and Tobago